Bruno-Pyatt School District No. 1 was a school district headquartered in Eros, in unincorporated Marion County, Arkansas. In addition to Eros it served Bruno and Pyatt.

It operated Bruno-Pyatt Elementary School and Bruno–Pyatt High School.

On July 1, 2004, it consolidated with the St. Joe School District and the Western Grove School District into the Ozark Mountain School District.

References

Further reading
 Map of Arkansas School Districts pre-July 1, 2004
 (Download) - Includes maps of predecessor districts

External links
 
 Bruno-Pyatt School District No. 1 Marion County, Arkansas General Purpose Financial Statements and Other Reports June 30, 2002 
 Bruno-Pyatt School District No. 1 Marion County, Arkansas General Purpose Financial Statements and Other Reports June 30, 2003
 Bruno-Pyatt School District No. 1 Marion County, Arkansas Regulatory Basis Financial Statements  And Other Reports June 30, 2004 

Defunct school districts in Arkansas
Education in Marion County, Arkansas
2004 disestablishments in Arkansas
School districts disestablished in 2004